Reddyanus ranawanai is a species of scorpion in the family Buthidae endemic to Sri Lanka.

Etymology
The species name is given after Prof. Kithsiri B. Ranawana, a leading zoologist in Sri Lanka, who engaged in several biodiversity researches throughout the country.

Description
Total length is about 35 to 43 mm. Body reddish, with brown to black spots. Chelicera strongly reticulated with spotted fingers. Ventrum of mesosoma and pedipalps are yellowish brown with a two black spots on the sixth and seventh sternites. Carapace and pedipalps are yellowish to reddish dorsally and laterally, with brown to black spots. Pedipalps, legs, femur, patella and manus with similar coloration. Male has very slightly longer metasomal segments than female. Pedipalp movable finger is longer than manus of chela. Pedipalps and legs consists with brown maculation, which is also found on femur and patella. There are 10 carinae on first metasomal segment, and second through fourth segments with eight carinae. The fifth segment consists with five carinae in female but male has three to five carinae. Subaculear tooth is wide and rounded. There are 12 to 14 pectinal teeth. Carapace without carinae but with large granules. Telson elongate and with a ventral carina. Metasomal segments and telson are yellowish to reddish with spots.

References

Animals described in 2016
ranawanai